Andaq (also Romanized as Andāq, Andak, and Andākh) is a village in Qaqazan-e Gharbi Rural District, in the Central District of Takestan County, Qazvin Province, Iran. At the 2006 census, its population was 1,024, in 242 families.

References 

Populated places in Takestan County